Qischil Gandrum Minny (born 22 July 1988) is an Indonesian professional footballer who plays as a forward for Liga 2 club Persijap Jepara.

Honours

Club
PSS Sleman
 Liga 2: 2018

References

External links
 Qischil Minny at Soccerway
 Qischil Minny at Liga Indonesia

1987 births
Association football forwards
Living people
Indonesian footballers
Liga 1 (Indonesia) players
Deltras F.C. players
Persik Kediri players
Indonesian Premier Division players
Persiku Kudus players
PS Barito Putera players
People from Nganjuk Regency
Sportspeople from East Java